Westerham Wood is a  biological Site of Special Scientific Interest north of Westerham in Kent.

This ancient oak wood on Gault Clay is traditionally managed, and it has a diverse ground flora and an outstanding range of breeding birds. The insect fauna is also diverse, and 77 bryophyte and nearly 300 fungus species have been recorded.

The site is private land with no public access.

References

Sites of Special Scientific Interest in Kent
Westerham
Forests and woodlands of Kent